It Amazes Me is Liza Minnelli's second solo studio album, released on May 10, 1965, by Capitol Records. It contained her interpretations of eleven pop standards. It was recorded between December 1964 and January 1965 at Capitol Records' New York studio at 151 West 46th Street.

Album information
After Liza Minnelli's first album for Capitol Records was released in September 1964, she kept busy with a tour (The Fantasticks with Elliott Gould), television appearances, and even co-starred alongside her mother Judy Garland in a series of concerts in London (Judy Garland and Liza Minnelli Live at the London Palladium). In December of the same year she was reunited with the same team that worked on her previous studio effort, with Minnelli displaying a larger vocal range than that showcased on  Liza! Liza!. The album mixes uptempo tunes and ballads.

The album cover boasts that it "sounds better than stereo has ever sounded before!" thanks to the "New improved Full Dimensional Sound". A bigger budget was also spent for a larger orchestra, with Peter Matz again responsible for the orchestral treatment given to the project. One track was left off the original track listing but was added to the set when reissued in its entirety in The Complete Capitol Collection, a medley of "Walk Right In / How Come You Do Me Like You Do".

Track listing

Side one
"Wait Till You See Him" (Richard Rodgers, Lorenz Hart) 
"My Shining Hour" (Johnny Mercer, Harold Arlen)
"I Like the Likes of You" (Vernon Duke, Yip Harburg)
"It Amazes Me" (Cy Coleman, Carolyn Leigh)
"Looking at You" (Cole Porter)
"I Never Has Seen Snow" (Harold Arlen, Truman Capote)

Side two
"Plenty of Time" (John Kander, Fred Ebb)
"For Every Man There's a Woman" (Harold Arlen, Leo Robin)
"Lorelei" (George Gershwin, Ira Gershwin)
"Shouldn't There Be Lightning?" (Larry Alexander, Billy Goldenberg)
"Nobody Knows You When You're Down and Out" (Jimmy Cox)
"Walk Right In" (Hosea Woods, Gus Cannon, Bill Svanoe, Erik Darling) / "How Come You Do Me Like You Do" (Gene Austin, Roy Bergere) (Medley)

Personnel
Producer: Si Rady
Orchestra arranged and conducted by Peter Matz
Harry J. Gittes - photography

References

Liza Minnelli: When It Comes Down to It.......1968–1977 liner notes by Glenn A. Baker, 2003
Liza Minnelli: The Complete A&M Recordings liner notes by Scott Schechter, 2008
Liza Minnelli: The Complete Capitol Collection liner notes by Scott Schechter, 2006

Liza Minnelli albums
1965 albums
Capitol Records albums
Albums arranged by Peter Matz
Albums conducted by Peter Matz